Thomas Drugs is a drug store located in Cross Plains, Tennessee. The building was constructed in 1915 and operated as a General Store, until it was purchased by the Thomas Family. The pharmacy opened in 1930. In 1976, the store was purchased by Dan Green. In January 1991, Thomas Drugs began to serve food items at the Soda Fountain. Thomas Drugs has been listed on the National Register of Historic Places since November 4, 1993.

References

External links
Thomas Drugs official website

Buildings and structures in Robertson County, Tennessee
National Register of Historic Places in Robertson County, Tennessee